Tapeinia is a genus of flowering plants in the family Iridaceae.  The genus name is derived from the Greek word tapeinos, meaning "low".

References

Sisyrinchieae
Iridaceae genera